Lee Han-sol (born 23 August 1995) is a South Korean handball player for SK Sugar Gliders and the South Korean national team.

She participated at the 2021 World Women's Handball Championship in Spain.

References

1995 births
Living people
South Korean female handball players